Cope Hill is a hill  west of Manfull Ridge on the north side of the Kohler Range in Marie Byrd Land. It was mapped by the United States Geological Survey from surveys and from U.S. Navy air photos, 1959–66, and named by the Advisory Committee on Antarctic Names for Lieutenant Winston Cope, MC, U.S. Navy Reserve, Medical Officer at the South Pole Station, 1974.

References 

Hills of Marie Byrd Land